Visa most commonly refers to:
Visa Inc., a US multinational financial and payment cards company
 Visa Debit card issued by the above company
 Visa Electron, a debit card 
 Visa Plus, an interbank network
Travel visa, a document that allows entry to a country

Visa or VISA may also refer to:

Film and television
 Visa (film), a 1983 Malayalam film
 "The Visa", a 1993 episode of the television sitcom Seinfeld

Music
 Visa (album), a 2014 album by Vladislav Delay
 Visa, a Swedish song type within the Swedish ballad tradition
 V.I.S.A., a French record label
 "Visa", a 1980 solo by Duncan Mackay
 "Visa", a song by M.I.A. from AIM
 "Visa", a composition by Charlie Parker, which he recorded in 1949
 "Visa", a song by Tulisa from The Female Boss
 "Visa para un sueño", a song by Juan Luis Guerra y 4:40 from the album Ojalá Que Llueva Café, 1989

Places
 Vişa, a river in Romania
 Sirsa Air Force Station (ICAO code), India
 Visa village, Jucu Commune, Cluj County, Romania

Science and technology
 Vancomycin intermediate-resistant Staphylococcus aureus or vancomycin-intermediate Staphylococcus aureus, a bacterium
 Virtual instrument software architecture, an input/output API used in the test and measurement industry
 VISA (gene) (virus induced signaling adaptor)
 Visa, a fabric marketed by Milliken & Company

Other uses
 Citroën Visa, an automobile
 Vancouver Island School of Art, Canada
 Viśa Īrasangä, Khotanese painter
 Viśa' Saṃbhava, Khotanese king

See also
 
 
 Vis (disambiguation)
 Visage (disambiguation)